Sweden competed at the 2002 Winter Paralympics in Salt Lake City, United States. 19 competitors from Sweden won 9 medals, 6 silver and 3 bronze, and finished 19th in the medal table.

Alpine skiing 

Women

Cross-country skiing

Men's events

Ice sledge hockey

Summary

Men's Tournament 
Team: Mikael Axtelius, Daniel Cederstam, Dedjo Engmark, Marcus Holm, Niklas Ingvarsson, Rasmus Isaksson, Bengt-Gösta Johansson, Kenth Jonsson, Göran Karlsson, Jens Kask, Joakim Larsson, Mats Nyman, Leif Norgren, Frank Pedersen, Leif Wahlstedt

See also 
 Sweden at the Paralympics
 Sweden at the 2002 Winter Olympics

References 

2002
2002 in Swedish sport
Nations at the 2002 Winter Paralympics